Man Is Man's Enemy (Georgian:Katsi katsistvis mgelia) is a 1923 Soviet silent adventure film directed by Ivane Perestiani.

Cast
 Vladimir Maksimov as Kraev  
 T. Maqsimova as Tatiana Aleqseevna  
 Ivane Perestiani as Carter  
 V. Djamgarova as Baroness Fux

References

Bibliography 
 Rollberg, Peter. Historical Dictionary of Russian and Soviet Cinema. Scarecrow Press, 2008.

External links 
 

1923 films
Soviet silent feature films
Georgian-language films
Films directed by Ivan Perestiani
Soviet black-and-white films
Soviet adventure films
1923 adventure films
Silent adventure films
Soviet-era films from Georgia (country)
Adventure films from Georgia (country)